The 2019–20 Liga IV Călărași was the 39th season of the Liga IV Călărași, the fourth tier of the Romanian football league system. The season began on 3 August 2019 and was scheduled to end in June 2020, but was suspended in March because of the COVID-19 pandemic in Romania. 

On 4 July 2020, AJF Călărași (County Football Association) declared Venus Independența the county champion. But not being eligible for promotion, it was decided to organize a play-off between the 2nd and 3rd place to establish the team that will represent Călărași County at the promotion play-off to Liga III. Following the withdrawal of 2nd ranked team, Unirea Mânăstirea, the team ranked 3rd, Oltenița, was qualify for promotion play-off.

Team changes

To Liga IV Călărași
Relegated from Liga III
 Oltenița

Promoted from Liga V Călărași
 Vulturii Gălbinași
 Petrolul Ileana
 Conpet Ștefan Cel Mare

From Liga IV Călărași
Promoted to Liga III
 Mostiștea Ulmu

Relegated to Liga V Călărași
 Viitorul Dragoș Vodă
 Zarea Cuza Vodă

League table

Promotion play-off

Champions of Liga IV – Călărași County face champions of Liga IV – Ilfov County and Liga IV – Prahova County.

Region 6 (South)

Group A

See also

Main Leagues
 2019–20 Liga I
 2019–20 Liga II
 2019–20 Liga III
 2019–20 Liga IV

County Leagues (Liga IV series)

 2019–20 Liga IV Alba
 2019–20 Liga IV Arad
 2019–20 Liga IV Argeș
 2019–20 Liga IV Bacău
 2019–20 Liga IV Bihor
 2019–20 Liga IV Bistrița-Năsăud
 2019–20 Liga IV Botoșani
 2019–20 Liga IV Brăila
 2019–20 Liga IV Brașov
 2019–20 Liga IV Bucharest
 2019–20 Liga IV Buzău
 2019–20 Liga IV Caraș-Severin
 2019–20 Liga IV Cluj
 2019–20 Liga IV Constanța
 2019–20 Liga IV Covasna
 2019–20 Liga IV Dâmbovița
 2019–20 Liga IV Dolj
 2019–20 Liga IV Galați 
 2019–20 Liga IV Giurgiu
 2019–20 Liga IV Gorj
 2019–20 Liga IV Harghita
 2019–20 Liga IV Hunedoara
 2019–20 Liga IV Ialomița
 2019–20 Liga IV Iași
 2019–20 Liga IV Ilfov
 2019–20 Liga IV Maramureș
 2019–20 Liga IV Mehedinți
 2019–20 Liga IV Mureș
 2019–20 Liga IV Neamț
 2019–20 Liga IV Olt
 2019–20 Liga IV Prahova
 2019–20 Liga IV Sălaj
 2019–20 Liga IV Satu Mare
 2019–20 Liga IV Sibiu
 2019–20 Liga IV Suceava
 2019–20 Liga IV Teleorman
 2019–20 Liga IV Timiș
 2019–20 Liga IV Tulcea
 2019–20 Liga IV Vâlcea
 2019–20 Liga IV Vaslui
 2019–20 Liga IV Vrancea

References

External links
 Official website 

Liga IV seasons
Sport in Călărași County